Gattan-e Sofla (also Romanized as Gattān-e Soflá; also known as Gattān-e Pā’īn and Gattān-e Pākūhī) is a village in Kangan Rural District, in the Central District of Jask County, Hormozgan Province, Iran. At the 2006 census, its population was 386, in 67 families.

References 

Populated places in Jask County